Falkenstein is a town in the Vogtlandkreis district, in Saxony, Germany. It is situated 4 km southwest of Auerbach, and 17 km east of Plauen.

Population Development 

Historical Population (ab 31 December 1960):

  Datasource: Statistisches Landesamt Sachsen

Sons and daughters of the city 

 Otto Lindner (1893–1983), writer
 Gottfried Weimann (1907–1990), javelin thrower
 Helmut Rauca (1908–1983), perpetrator of the Holocaust, born in the district of Trieb
 Wolfgang Männel (1937–2006), economist
 Ulrich Eisenfeld (born 1939), painter
 Bernd Eisenfeld (1941–2010), historian and GDR opposition leader
 Gabriele Eckart (born 1954), writer

References 

Vogtlandkreis